Raúl Antonio Viver (born 17 March 1961) is a former professional tennis player from Ecuador.

Career
Viver was the world number one ranked junior player in 1979, the year that he won the Orange Bowl (18s & Under). He also reached his only semi-final on the Grand Prix tennis circuit in 1979, at Bogota.

In the 1982 French Open, Viver and partner Luca Bottazzi had a win over fifth seeds Anders Järryd and Hans Simonsson, but lost in the second round. Three years later he won his only Grand Slam singles match, over world number 42 John Fitzgerald. He was a mixed doubles quarter-finalist in the 1986 French Open, with Mariana Perez-Roldan.

The Ecuadorian reached the quarter-finals at Kitzbuhel in 1984 and Buenos Aires the following year.

He appeared in 18 Davis Cup ties for Ecuador during his career, from 1978 to 1990. In the mid-1980s he was part of the team which competed in the World Group and faced players like Jimmy Arias, Boris Becker and Miloslav Mečíř. Viver finished with a 15/13 overall record, winning 14 of his 25 singles rubbers.

Challenger titles

Singles: (3)

Doubles: (3)

References

1961 births
Living people
Ecuadorian male tennis players
Sportspeople from Guayaquil
South American Games medalists in tennis
South American Games gold medalists for Ecuador
South American Games bronze medalists for Ecuador
Competitors at the 1978 Southern Cross Games
Tennis players at the 1979 Pan American Games
Pan American Games competitors for Ecuador
20th-century Ecuadorian people